José Luis Munguía Linares (28 October 1959 – 24 March 1985) was a football player from El Salvador who was a non-playing squad member at the 1982 FIFA World Cup Finals in Spain.

Club career
Nicknamed "El Halcón" (The Falcon), Munguía played his whole career at Salvadoran FAS.

International career
Munguía has represented El Salvador in 5 FIFA World Cup qualification matches.

Death
He died in 1985 after suffering major injuries after a heavy car crash.

References

External links
Mejor portero de FAS? with press cutting about his death - CD FAS 

1959 births
1985 deaths
Sportspeople from San Salvador
Association football goalkeepers
Salvadoran footballers
El Salvador international footballers
1982 FIFA World Cup players
C.D. FAS footballers
Road incident deaths in El Salvador